Lisa Holton  is an American writer, editor and author. Holton serves corporate, college, nonprofit and editorial clients, and her writing has been featured in such national publications as Southwest Spirit, The National Law Journal, Parents, the ABA Journal and REALTOR Magazine. She is a former Business Editor of the Chicago Sun-Times and has authored or edited 15 nonfiction books and ebooks including Business Valuation for Dummies (with Jim Bates) and For Members Only: A History and Guide to Chicago's Oldest Private Clubs.

External links 
Society of Midland Authors
The Authors Guild

Living people
Medill School of Journalism alumni
Place of birth missing (living people)
Year of birth missing (living people)
Writers from Chicago
American business writers
Women business writers
Chicago Sun-Times people